The Kwansei Gakuin Fighters football program, established in 1941, represents Kwansei Gakuin University in college football. Kwansei Gakuin is a member of the Kansai Collegiate American Football League.

External links
  (Japanese)

American football in Japan
American football teams established in 1941
1941 establishments in Japan